This is a list of Goodenia species accepted by the Australian Plant Census as at December 2020, and additionally G. konigsbergeri, occurring outside Australia, accepted by Plants of the World Online:

Goodenia affinis de Vriese - silver goodenia (W.A.)
Goodenia albiflora  Schltdl. - white goodenia (S.A.)
Goodenia amplexans F.Muell. - clasping goodenia (S.A.)
Goodenia anfracta J.M.Black - zig-zag hand-flower (S.A., W.A., N.T.)
Goodenia angustifolia Carolin (Qld., N.T.)
Goodenia arachnoidea Carolin (W.A.)
Goodenia arenicola Carolin (Qld.)
Goodenia argillacea Carolin (N.T.)
Goodenia armitiana F.Muell. - narrow-leaved goodenia (W.A., N.T., Qld.)
Goodenia armstrongiana de Vriese (N.T., Qld., New Guinea)
Goodenia arthrotricha Benth. (W.A.)
Goodenia atriplexifolia A.E.Holland & T.P.Boyle (Qld.)
Goodenia azurea F.Muell. – blue goodenia (W.A., N.T., Qld.)
Goodenia bellidifolia  Sm. – daisy goodenia (Qld., N.S.W., Vic.)
Goodenia benthamiana Carolin – small-leaf goodenia (Vic., S.A.)
Goodenia berardiana (Gaudich.) Carolin (W.A., S.A., N.T., N.S.W.)
Goodenia berringbinensis Carolin (W.A.)
Goodenia bicolor  F.Muell. ex Benth. (W.A., N.T.)
Goodenia blackiana Carolin – Black's goodenia (S.A., Vic.)
Goodenia brachypoda (F.Muell. ex Benth.) Carolin (W.A., N.T.)
Goodenia brunnea Carolin (S.A., N.T.)
Goodenia byrnesii Carolin (W.A., N.T., Qld.)
Goodenia calcarata (F.Muell.) F.Muell. – streaked goodenia (N.T., S.A., Qld., N.S.W.)
Goodenia campestris Carolin (W.A., N.T.)
Goodenia centralis Carolin (W.A., S.A., N.T.)
Goodenia chambersii F.Muell. (S.A.)
Goodenia chthonocephala Carolin (N.T.)
Goodenia cirrifica F.Muell. (N.T.)
Goodenia claytoniacea F.Muell. ex Benth. (W.A.)
Goodenia coerulea R.Br. (W.A.)
Goodenia concinna Benth. (W.A.)
Goodenia convexa Carolin (W.A.)
Goodenia coronopifolia R.Br. (W.A., N.T.)
Goodenia corralina L.W.Sage & K.A.Sheph. (W.A.)
Goodenia corynocarpa F.Muell. (W.A.)
Goodenia cravenii R.L.Barrett & M.D.Barrett (W.A.)
Goodenia crenata Carolin & L.W.Sage (W.A., N.T.)
Goodenia cusackiana (F.Muell.) Carolin (W.A.)
Goodenia cycloptera R.Br. (W.A., N.T., S.A., Qld., N.S.W.)   
Goodenia cylindrocarpa Albr. (N.T.)
Goodenia debilis A.E.Holland & T.P.Boyle (Qld.)
Goodenia decurrens R.Br. (N.S.W.)   
Goodenia decursiva W.Fitzg. (W.A.)
Goodenia delicata Carolin (Qld., N.S.W.)
Goodenia dimorpha Maiden & Betche (N.S.W.)
Goodenia disperma F.Muell. (Qld.)
Goodenia drummondii Carolin (W.A.)
Goodenia durackiana Carolin (W.A., N.T.)
Goodenia dyeri K.Krause (W.A.)
Goodenia eatoniana F.Muell. (W.A.)
Goodenia effusa A.E.Holland (Qld.)
Goodenia elaiosoma Cowie (N.T.)
Goodenia elderi F.Muell. & Tate (W.A.)
Goodenia elongata Labill. – lanky goodenia (N.S.W., Vic., Tas., S.A.)
Goodenia eremophila E.Pritz. (W.A.)
Goodenia expansa A.E.Holland & T.P.Boyle (Qld.)
Goodenia fascicularis F.Muell. & Tate – silky goodenia (N.S.W., Vic., Qld., S.A., N.T.)
Goodenia fasciculata (Benth.) Carolin (W.A.)
Goodenia faucium Carolin – Mount Liebig goodenia (N.T.)
Goodenia filiformis R.Br. – thread-leaved goodenia (W.A.)
Goodenia fordiana Carolin (N.S.W.)
Goodenia forrestii F.Muell. (W.A.)
Goodenia geniculata R.Br. – bent goodenia, native primrose (S.A., Vic., Tas.)
Goodenia gibbosa Carolin (N.T., W.A., S.A.)
Goodenia glabra R.Br. – shiny pansy, smooth goodenia (W.A., S.A., N.T., Qld., N.S.W.)
Goodenia glandulosa K.Krause (W.A., S.A., N.T.)
Goodenia glareicola Carolin (W.A.)
Goodenia glauca F.Muell. – pale goodenia (Qld., N.S.W., Vic., S.A.)
Goodenia gloeophylla Carolin (W.A., N.T.)
Goodenia glomerata Maiden & Betche (N.S.W.)
Goodenia goodeniacea (F.Muell.) Carolin (N.T., Qld.)
Goodenia gracilis R.Br. – slender goodenia (N.S.W., Vic., Qld., N.T.)
Goodenia grandiflora Sims – large-flowered goodenia, pinnate goodenia, mountain primrose (N.T., Qld., N.S.W.)
Goodenia granitica L.W.Sage & K.A.Sheph. (W.A.)
Goodenia gypsicola Symon (W.A., S.A.)
Goodenia halophila Albr. (N.T., W.A.)
Goodenia hartiana L.W.Sage (W.A.)
Goodenia hassallii F.Muell. (W.A.)
Goodenia havilandii Maiden & Betche – hill goodenia (N.S.W., Qld., S.A., N.T.)
Goodenia heatheriana L.W.Sage (W.A.)
Goodenia hederacea Sm. – forest goodenia, ivy goodenia (Qld., N.S.W., Vic.)
Goodenia helmsii (E.Pritz.) Carolin (W.A.)
Goodenia heppleana (W.Fitzg.) Carolin (N.T., W.A.)
Goodenia heterochila F.Muell. – serrated goodenia (W.A., N.T., S.A., Qld.)
Goodenia heteromera F.Muell. – spreading goodenia, fan flower (Qld., N.S.W., Vic., S.A.)
Goodenia heterophylla Sm. (N.S.W., Vic., Qld.)
Goodenia heterotricha M.D.Barrett & R.L.Barrett (W.A.)
Goodenia hirsuta F.Muell. (W.A., N.T., S.A., Qld.)
Goodenia hispida R.Br. (N.T.)
Goodenia holtzeana (Specht) Carolin (N.T.)
Goodenia humilis R.Br. – swamp goodenia (Vic., S.A., Tas., N.S.W.)
Goodenia incana R.Br. (W.A.)
Goodenia integerrima Carolin (W.A.)
Goodenia inundata L.W.Sage & J.P.Pigott (W.A.)
Goodenia iyouta Carolin (W.A.)
Goodenia janamba Carolin (N.T., W.A., Qld.)
Goodenia jaurdiensis L.W.Sage & K.A.Sheph. (W.A.)
Goodenia kakadu Carolin (N.T.)
Goodenia katabudjar Cranfield & L.W.Sage (W.A.) 
Goodenia kingiana Carolin (W.A.)
Goodenia konigsbergeri (Backer) Backer ex Bold. (Southeast Asia)
Goodenia krauseana Carolin (W.A.)
Goodenia laevis Benth. (W.A.)
Goodenia lamprosperma F.Muell. (W.A., N.T., Qld.)
Goodenia lanata R.Br. – trailing goodenia, native primrose (Vic. Tas.)
Goodenia lancifolia L.W.Sage & Cranfield – scruffy goodenia (W.A.)
Goodenia larapinta Tate (N.T.)
Goodenia leiosperma Carolin (N.T.) 
Goodenia leptoclada Benth. – thin-stemmed goodenia (W.A.)
Goodenia lineata J.H.Willis – Grampians goodenia (Vic.)
Goodenia lobata Ising (S.A.)
Goodenia lunata J.M.Black – stiff goodenia (N.S.W., N.T., Qld., S.A., Vic., W.A.)
Goodenia lyrata Carolin (W.A.)
Goodenia macbarronii Carolin – narrow goodenia (N.S.W., Vic.)
Goodenia macmillanii F.Muell. – pinnate goodenia (Vic.)
Goodenia macroplectra (F.Muell.) Carolin (W.A.)
Goodenia maideniana W.Fitzg. (W.A., N.T.)
Goodenia malvina Carolin (W.A., N.T.) 
Goodenia maretensis R.L.Barrett (W.A.)
Goodenia megasepala Carolin (Qld.)
Goodenia micrantha Hemsl. ex Carolin (W.A., S.A.)
Goodenia microptera F.Muell. (W.A.)
Goodenia mimuloides S.Moore (W.A.)
Goodenia minutiflora F.Muell. (N.T., Qld.)
Goodenia modesta J.M.Black (W.A., N.T., S.A.)
Goodenia mueckeana F.Muell. (W.A., N.T., S.A.)
Goodenia muelleriana Carolin (W.A.)
Goodenia neglecta (Carolin) Carolin (N.T.)
Goodenia neogoodenia (C.A.Gardner & A.S.George) Carolin (W.A.)
Goodenia nigrescens Carolin (N.T., Qld.)
Goodenia nocoleche Pellow & J.L.Porter (N.S.W.)
Goodenia nuda E.Pritz. (W.A.)
Goodenia occidentalis Carolin – western goodenia (W.A., N.T., S.A., N.S.W.)
Goodenia ochracea Carolin (W.A.)
Goodenia odonnellii F.Muell. (W.A., N.T., Qld.)
Goodenia ovata Sm. (S.A., Qld., N.S.W., Vic., Tas.)   
Goodenia pallida Carolin (W.A.)
Goodenia paniculata Sm. – branched goodenia (Qld., N.S.W., Vic.)
Goodenia pascua Carolin (W.A.)
Goodenia peacockiana Carolin (W.A.)
Goodenia pedicellata L.W.Sage & K.W.Dixon (W.A.)
Goodenia perryi C.A.Gardner ex Carolin (W.A.)
Goodenia phillipsiae Carolin (W.A.)
Goodenia pilosa (R.Br.) Carolin (N.T., Qld., Indonesia, China, Philippines)
Goodenia pinifolia de Vriese (W.A.)
Goodenia pinnatifida Schltdl. – cut-leaf goodenia, scrambled eggs, mother ducks (W.A., S.A., Qld., N.S.W., A.C.T., Vic., Tas.)
Goodenia porphyrea (Carolin) Carolin (N.T.)
Goodenia potamica Carolin (N.T.)
Goodenia prostrata Carolin (W.A.)
Goodenia psammophila L.W.Sage & M.D.Barrett (W.A.)
Goodenia pterigosperma R.Br. (W.A.)
Goodenia pulchella Benth. (W.A.)
Goodenia pumilio R.Br. (W.A., N.T., Qld., New Guinea)
Goodenia purpurascens R.Br. (W.A., N.T., Qld., New Guinea)
Goodenia purpurea (F.Muell.) Carolin (N.T.)
Goodenia pusilla (de Vriese) de Vriese (W.A.)
Goodenia pusilliflora F.Muell. (W.A., S.A., N.S.W., Vic.)
Goodenia quadrifida (Carolin) Carolin (N.T.)
Goodenia quadrilocularis R.Br. (W.A.)
Goodenia quasilibera Carolin (S.A., W.A.)
Goodenia racemosa F.Muell. (Qld.)
Goodenia ramelii F.Muell. (W.A., N.T., S.A., Qld.)
Goodenia redacta Carolin (W.A., N.T., Qld.)
Goodenia robusta (Benth.) K.Krause – woolly goodenia (S.A., Vic.)
Goodenia rostrivalvis Domin (N.S.W.)
Goodenia rosulata Domin (Qld., N.S.W.) 
Goodenia rotundifolia R.Br. (Qld., N.S.W.)
Goodenia rupestris Carolin (N.T.)
Goodenia saccata Carolin (S.A.)
Goodenia salina L.W.Sage & K.A.Sheph. (W.A.)
Goodenia salmoniana (F.Muell.) Carolin (W.A.)
Goodenia scaevolina F.Muell. (N.T., W.A.)
Goodenia scapigera R.Br. – white goodenia (W.A.)
Goodenia schwerinensis Carolin (W.A.)
Goodenia sepalosa F.Muell. ex Benth. (W.A.)
Goodenia sericostachya C.A.Gardner – silky-spiked goodenia (W.A.)
Goodenia splendida A.E.Holland & T.P.Boyle (Qld.)
Goodenia stellata Carolin (Qld.)
Goodenia stelligera R.Br. – spiked goodenia (N.S.W., Qld.)
Goodenia stenophylla F.Muell. (W.A.)
Goodenia stephensonii F.Muell. (N.S.W.)
Goodenia stirlingii F.M.Bailey (Qld.)
Goodenia stobbsiana F.Muell. (W.A.)
Goodenia strangfordii F.Muell. (N.T., Qld., W.A.)
Goodenia subauriculata C.T.White (N.T., Qld.)
Goodenia suffrutescens Carolin (W.A.)
Goodenia symonii (Carolin) Carolin (N.T.)
Goodenia tenuiloba F.Muell. (W.A.) 
Goodenia trichophylla de Vriese ex Benth. (W.A.) 
Goodenia triodiophila Carolin (W.A., S.A., N.T., Qld.)
Goodenia tripartita Carolin (W.A.)
Goodenia turleyae L.W.Sage & K.A.Sheph. (W.A.)
Goodenia valdentata P.J.Lang – Davenport Range goodenia (S.A)
Goodenia varia R.Br. – sticky goodenia (N.S.W., W.A., S.A.)
Goodenia vernicosa J.M.Black – wavy goodenia (S.A.)
Goodenia vilmoriniae F.Muell. (W.A., S.A., N.T., Qld.)
Goodenia virgata Carolin (W.A., N.T.)
Goodenia viridula Carolin (Qld.)
Goodenia viscida R.Br. – viscid goodenia (W.A.)   
Goodenia viscidula Carolin (N.T., Qld.)
Goodenia watsonii F.Muell. & Tate (W.A.)
Goodenia willisiana Carolin (N.S.W., Vic., S.A.)
Goodenia wilunensis Carolin (W.A.)
Goodenia xanthosperma F.Muell. (W.A.)
Goodenia xanthotricha de Vriese (W.A.)

References

List
Goodenia